Nery Ramón Ortíz (born 16 March 1973) is a Paraguayan former footballer who played as a defender. He made eleven appearances for the Paraguay national team from 1995 to 2001. He was also part of Paraguay's squad for the 1995 Copa América tournament.

References

External links
 
 

1973 births
Living people
Paraguayan footballers
Association football defenders
Paraguay international footballers
Club Guaraní players
Cerro Porteño players
12 de Octubre Football Club players